An olive branch is a branch of the olive tree, often used symbolically.

Olive Branch may also refer to:
Olive Branch, Illinois
Olive Branch, Mississippi
Olive Branch Airport
Olive Branch, North Carolina
Olive Branch, Ohio
The Olive Branch, a magazine
HMS Olive Branch – any one of five vessels of the British Royal Navy
Operation Olive Branch, code-name of the second Turkish military intervention in Syria starting in January 2018.
Olive Branch Petition, the 1775 petition by the Thirteen Colonies to Great Britain